Nick Teo, is a Singaporean television actor, host and model contracted under Mediacorp.

Acting career
In 2014, Teo made his acting debut in a half-hour long-running drama series produced by Mediacorp Channel 8, 118, which made got him nominated for Best Newcomer award in Star Awards 2015. He has a fanclub called Nickteology.

In 2015, he filmed Life - Fear Not and made a cameo appearance in The Journey: Our Homeland, Love In Air & You Can Be an Angel Too.

In 2016, he filmed two half-an hour long-running drama series in 118 II & Peace & Prosperity. He also made cameo appearance in Eat Already?, I Want to Be a Star &  The Dream Job.

In 2017, he landed a leading role in toggle original series, Dear DJ and made cameo appearance in  The Lead  & Dream Coder. He made a cameo appearance in a movie directed by Jack Neo, Ah Boys to Men 4.

In 2018, he filmed a toggle original series, Die Die Also Must Serve. Teo have juggled with two toggle original series Divided & Love At Cavenagh Bridge and also two drama Blessing 2 & 29th February.

In 2019, he acted in a Directorial Debut Project called If Only. He acted in 3 dramas called Hello From The Other Side which will debut in March 2019, While You Were Away which will debut in June 2019 and C.L.I.F. 5 which will debut in September 2019. He also made a cameo appearance in My One In A Million.

Personal life 
In 2022, Teo changed his Chinese name from 张鈞淯 (Zhāng Jūnyù) to 张奕恺 (Zhāng Yìkǎi) as it was hard to pronounce and other people do not know what is his Chinese name.

Filmography

Film

Television

Honours and awards

References

Living people
Singaporean television personalities
Singaporean people of Chinese descent
Ngee Ann Polytechnic alumni
Year of birth missing (living people)